Julia Wajda (born 28 September 1990) is a Polish ski mountaineer.

Wajda was born in Rabka-Zdrój. She started ski mountaineering in 2000, and competed first in 2001.

Selected results 
 2010:
 2nd (espoirs), Trophée des Gastlosen (ISMF World Cup), together with Paulina Figura
 2011:
 4th, World Championship, relay, together with Klaudia Tasz and Anna Figura
 10th, World Championship, team, together with Anna Figura
 2012:
 6th, European Championship, relay, together with  Anna Figura and Anna Tybor

External links 
 Julia Wajda at Skimountaineering.org

References 

1990 births
Living people
Polish female ski mountaineers
People from Rabka-Zdrój
Sportspeople from Lesser Poland Voivodeship
21st-century Polish women